The 2014 Hazfi Cup Final was the 27th final since 1975. The match was between Mes Kerman and Tractor which Tractor won the match 1–0, with Saeid Daghighi scored in the 51st minute. Tractor qualified for the group stage of the 2015 AFC Champions League as the winner of the tournament.

Format
The tie was contested over one legs, simply to last edition. If the teams could still not be separated, then extra time would have been played with a penalty shootout (taking place if the teams were still level after that).

Road to the finals

Mes Kerman

Mes Kerman began their work in the tournament with coach Parviz Mazloomi. They beat 2nd Division side Shahrdari Dezful in their home in Dezful, Ahvaz 3–1 with goals from Eslami, Edinho and Goudarzi. At Round of 16, Mes defeated another 2nd Division League club, Naft Omidiyeh at Kerman. In the next round, they beat current Azadegan League and former Iran Pro League side Sanat Naft in extra time to reach to the Last 4. In semi-final they defeated Iran Pro League leaders Esteghlal with a late goal from Edinho, this time with Luka Bonačić. The result saw that Mes advanced to the final for the first time and Esteghlal failed to reach to their 10th final appearance.

Tractor

Tractor was drawn in the fifth round with another Tabriz based club, Machine Sazi. Machine Sazi withdrew in favor to support Tractor in the tournament and Tractor awarded a 3–0 win. In Round of 16, Tractor defeated Naft Masjed Soleyman 2–0 with goals comes from Talebi and Ansarifard. In 1/4 Final, they beat Rah Ahan 2–0 at Takhti Stadium. Daghighi and Ansarifard scored Tractor's goals at the match. Tractor defeated Foolad 1–0 in 1/2 Final and reached the final with Daghighi scored the only goal of the match, held in Sahand Stadium.

Pre-match

Match history
This was Mes Kerman's first Hazfi final and Tractor's third appearance in the final match of the tournament. Both teams never won the title in their history before the match. Tractor's first final was in 1976 edition which they was defeated by Malavan in Amjadieh Stadium. Next time was in 1995 which they lost the final match to Bahman 2–1 on aggregate.

Ticketing
Ticket prices for the final was 5,000 toman. 50% of the stadium were belongs to the Mes Kerman's fans and others were belong to Tractor's fans.

Venue
The final was decided with draw which 15,000 capacity Shahid Bahonar Stadium (the Mes Kemran's home Stadium) was announced as the venue for the final.

Officials
FIFA listed referee, Yadollah Jahanbazi was announced as the final match referee by IRIFF's referees committee. Mohammad Reza Abolfazli and Ali Mirzabeigi assisted him. Moud Bonyadifar was also fourth official.

Detalis

See also 
 2013–14 Persian Gulf Cup
 2013–14 Azadegan League
 2013–14 Iran Football's 2nd Division
 2013–14 Iran Football's 3rd Division
 2013–14 Hazfi Cup
 Iranian Super Cup
 2013–14 Iranian Futsal Super League

References

2014
Hazfi
Sanat Mes Kerman F.C.
Tractor S.C. matches